Prague 11 is a municipal district (městská část) in Prague, Czech Republic. It is located in the south eastern part, 8 km from the City Center.

The district is split into two parts, mainly from the perspective of pedestrians, by the south-eastern highway to Brno. Praha 11 comprises Chodov, Opatov and Háje on one side and Roztyly on the other side.

Praha 11 is mostly residential district because of the huge panel housing estate called Jižní Město. At the beginning of 2016, it had 77,175 inhabitants. With the city centre it is connected by metro line C.

The administrative district (správní obvod) of the same name consists of municipal districts Prague 11, Křeslice, Šeberov and Újezd.

See also
Districts of Prague#Symbols

References

External links 
 Prague 11 - Official homepage, praha11.cz
 plan, praha11.cz

 
Districts of Prague